James Grover Wiley (born December 2, 1974) is an American professional boxer. He is perhaps best known for beating Julio César Chávez in the Mexican fighter's last professional bout.

References

External links

Middleweight boxers
1974 births
Living people
Boxers from Florida
American male boxers
Sportspeople from Winter Haven, Florida